The Voice (Chinese: 决战好声; pinyin: Juézhàn hǎo shēng)  is a Chinese-speaking Malaysian-Singaporean reality talent show and a version of The Voice format created by John de Mol. The series premiered on 17 September 2017 on Mandarin Chinese-language Singaporean channels StarHub TV and E City as well as on a Mandarin Chinese-Language Malaysian channel, Astro AEC. The show is hosted by Siow Hui Mei and Wong Hoon Hong, with William Tan and Weilong Liu serving as the V-Reporter. The coaches are Sky Wu, Della Ding, Hanjin Tan, and Gary Chaw. The winner of the first season was Lim Wen Suen, mentored by coach Gary Chaw, with receiving 62% of votes during the final showdown. The season finale aired on 17 December 2017.

Teams 
 Color key

Blind auditions 
The Blind Auditions were taped between 5, 6, 10 and 11 July 2017 at Pinewood Iskandar Malaysia Studios. The first episode of the Blind Auditions premiered on 17 September 2017.

Color key:

Episode 1 (17 September) 
The season's premiere aired on Sunday, 17 September 2017.

Group performance: The Voice coaches – Medley of "没时间后悔", "我爱他", "寂寞先生", and "特别的爱给特别的你".

Episode 2 (24 September)

Episode 3 (1 October)

Episode 4 (8 October)

Episode 5 (15 October) 

1 Gary Chaw pushed Sky Wu's button.

Episode 6 (22 October)

Episode 7 (29 October)

The Battles 
The Battle round started with episode 8 and ended with episode 10 (broadcast on 5, 12, 19 November 2017). As with most of the other versions, the coaches can steal two losing artists from another coach. Contestants who win their battle or are stolen by another coach will advance to the Knockout rounds.

Color key:

The Knockouts 
Color key:

Live shows 
Color key:

Week 1: Semifinals (10 December) 
The Top 16 performed on 10 December 2017. Each team is allowed two artists advance to the finals, one is the highest public votes receiver; one is chosen by his/her coach.

Week 2: Finals (17 December) 
The finalists will perform on Sunday, 17 December 2017. The two artists with the highest votes will advance to the final showdown. The cumulative votes will be reset in the final showdown, with the winner in this round winning the competition.

Elimination chart

Overall 

Color key
Artist's info

Result details

Team 

Color key
Artist's info

Results details

Artists' appearances on other talent shows 
 Rax Teh, Nick Kung, Daniel Sher, and Eugene Wen were a contestant on 2013, 2014, 2015 and 2016 of Astro Star Quest, and finished in second, sixth, second, and fourth place respectively.
 Vivian Chua was a contestant on the seventh season of One Million Star, where she was eliminated in the Top 16.
 Eugene Wen and Ape Kao appeared on the first season and the second season of Chinese Million Star as a challenger in the Challenging Round respectively.
 Eugene Wen and Rax Teh appeared on the second season and the third season of Chinese Million Star, and finished in the Top 29 and seventh place respectively.
 Jay Chen and An Hung Lin were a contestant on the first season of Million Star, and finished in seventh and eighth place respectively.
 Zhang Minhua appeared on the first season of Super Star, and finished in stage 13.
Suzanne Low, Annabella Chua, Eli Low (from Only), and Nick Kung later appeared on the third season of Sing! China:
Nick Kung did not score a chair turn and was eliminated in the blind audition. His audition was not broadcast on television.
Eli Low received a four chair turn and joining Team Jay Chou, but later was eliminated in the sing-off round.
Annabella Chua received a three chair turn and joining Team Jay Chou, but later has been withdrawn the competition due to the new rules set out by the State Administration of Radio and Television which ban individuals below 18 years old from participating local television talent shows. Her audition video was edited out of broadcast on re-runs and video-streaming websites.
Suzanne Low received a two chair turn and joining Team Harlem Yu, but later was eliminated in the Cross Knockouts.
 Celine Wong later took part in Singapore's SPOP Sing! as one of top 20 finalists, and was eliminated in the semi-finals after losing the audience's vote.
Annabella Chua later appeared on the fourth season of Sing! China, which received a one chair turn and joined Team Na Ying, but later was eliminated in the Cross Knockouts.
Becky Yeung and Suzanne Low later took part in the second season of Jungle Voice, and were eliminated in the semifinals and episode 5 respectively.
Alfred Sng (from Zhang Minhua & Alfred Sng) later appeared on the first season of Jungle Voice, and where eliminated in episode 5. After the show, he joined We Are Young as one of the 84 trainees, which finished in the 30th place.

References 

Singapore and Malaysia
Reality television articles with incorrect naming style